Vermetus eruca is a species of sea snail, a marine gastropod mollusk in the family Vermetidae, the worm snails or worm shells.

Description

Distribution

References

External links

Vermetidae
Taxa named by Jean-Baptiste Lamarck
Gastropods described in 1818